Alpena Mall was  an enclosed shopping mall located in Alpena, Michigan at 2380 US Highway 23 South. It is the only enclosed mall in Northeast Michigan and its anchor tenants are Gordon Food Service and Dunham's Sports.

The mall originally featured JCPenney and Kmart, which moved across the street in the late 1990s. The Kmart space is now occupied by Dunham's and Gordon Food Service. Shoe Dept. opened a store at the mall in 2014.

In December 2018, the mall was purchased by Molla Investments.

On June 4, 2020, JCPenney announced that it would be closing around October 2020 as part of a plan to close 154 stores nationwide. After JCPenney closed, GFS and Dunham's Sports were the only anchor stores left.

In late 2020, I2P purchased the mall and announced plans to redevelop it into a manufacturing center. Due to this, throughout late 2020 and early 2021, many of the mall's stores relocated to downtown Alpena, bringing the mall's store count from approximately 20 to only 9.

According to The Alpena News, the mall closed in December 2022.

References

Buildings and structures in Alpena County, Michigan
Defunct shopping malls in the United States
Shopping malls in Michigan
Shopping malls established in 1980
Shopping malls disestablished in 2022